Tsūjun Bridge (通潤橋 -kyō) is an aqueduct in Yamato, Kumamoto, Japan. It is an arch bridge completed in 1854 and is 84.0m long. The arch spans 27.3m. It is the largest stone aqueduct in Japan.

The Japanese Agency for Cultural Affairs has designated the bridge an Important Cultural Property.

History and technology
This bridge proves the high level of stone bridge technology in existence at the time of its construction. Yasunosuke Futa (1801–1873), who was the head of the then Yabe village, planned it and, after obtaining funding, succeeded in building the bridge in 1854 with the help of the group of 41 stone technicians and many farmers. Its purpose was to let water flow into a higher area (Shiroito Plateau) for farming. After placing wooden frames, stones were placed on the frames and three stone aqueducts were made. After that, the wooden frames were removed. The stone aqueducts were made watertight with mortar. The bridge was completed in 1854.

Because the aqueduct is lower than the upstream and downstream waterways, sand and mud may accumulate in the aqueduct. To clean the accumulated dirt, the bridge is able to occasionally release water (and dirt) into the river below. This is mostly done in the farmers' off-season.

References

External links
 YouTube Tuujunkyo

See also
History of Kumamoto Prefecture

Bridges in Japan
Bridges completed in 1854
Buildings and structures in Kumamoto Prefecture
Aqueducts in Japan
Important Cultural Properties of Japan
Tourist attractions in Kumamoto Prefecture
1854 establishments in Japan